Endrit Karameto (born 13 December 1995 in Tirana) is an Albanian professional footballer who played for Partizani Tirana in the Albanian Superliga but retired after to many knee problems.

References

1995 births
Living people
Footballers from Tirana
Albanian footballers
Association football midfielders
Association football defenders
FK Partizani Tirana players
Kategoria Superiore players